David Joseph Popkins (born November 16, 1989) is an American professional baseball coach for the Minnesota Twins of Major League Baseball.

Career
Popkins graduated from St. Augustine High School in San Diego, California where he was named first team eastern league in 2007 and 2008. He was Eastern league player of the year in 2008. Popkins graduated from the University of California, Davis, where he played college baseball for the UC Davis Aggies. He was named All Big West First Team for two years. After going undrafted out of college, Popkins signed with the St. Louis Cardinals, and made the post season all star team in Advanced A in the Florida State league for the Palm Beach Cardinals in 2013. He reached Double A in 2014. He played in independent league baseball with the Washington Wild Things, hitting 35 home runs over two seasons. He retired as an active player in 2017.

In 2019, the Dodgers named Popkins as a hitting coach for the Arizona Dodgers of the Arizona League. In 2021, he coached for the Great Lakes Loons.

After the 2021 season, the Minnesota Twins hired Popkins to be their hitting coach.

References

External links

1989 births
Living people
Minnesota Twins coaches
Major League Baseball hitting coaches
UC Davis Aggies baseball players
Gulf Coast Cardinals players
Batavia Muckdogs players
Peoria Chiefs players
Palm Beach Cardinals players
Springfield Cardinals players
Washington Wild Things players
Sioux Falls Canaries players
Baseball players from San Diego